Gorka Azkorra Trueba (born 25 January 1983) is a Spanish football coach and former professional footballer. He is currently the assistant coach of Indian Super League club Goa.

He amassed Segunda División totals of 178 matches and 22 goals over eight seasons, representing mainly in the competition Albacete and Salamanca (two years apiece). In La Liga, he appeared for Athletic Bilbao.

Club career
Born in Bilbao, Basque Country, Azkorra emerged through local giants Athletic Bilbao's youth system, but could only amass five appearances with the main squad – all in the 2004–05 season – after having scored prolifically with the club's B and feeder teams. He made his La Liga debut on 3 October 2004, playing 25 minutes in a 1–3 away loss against Getafe CF.

Released in the 2005 January transfer window, Azkorra resumed his career in the second division, with Recreativo de Huelva, CD Numancia, Albacete Balompié and UD Salamanca. Whilst with the latter side, in the 2008–09 campaign, he reunited with former Athletic youth teammate Mikel Dañobeitia.

Azkorra continued competing in the second and third levels during the following years, representing CD Lugo, Deportivo Alavés, CD Guadalajara, Hércules CF, Gimnàstic de Tarragona, Real Murcia and Sestao River Club.

References

External links

1983 births
Living people
Spanish footballers
Footballers from Bilbao
Association football forwards
La Liga players
Segunda División players
Segunda División B players
Tercera División players
CD Basconia footballers
Bilbao Athletic footballers
Athletic Bilbao footballers
Recreativo de Huelva players
CD Numancia players
Albacete Balompié players
UD Salamanca players
CD Lugo players
Deportivo Alavés players
CD Guadalajara (Spain) footballers
Hércules CF players
Gimnàstic de Tarragona footballers
Real Murcia players
Sestao River footballers
Zamudio SD players
Spain youth international footballers